Soon is a rock opera with music by Joseph M. Kookoolis and Scott Fagan, lyrics by Fagan, and a book by Martin Duberman and Robert Greenwald. It is based on a story by Fagan and Kookoolis.

The story is about a group of young musicians who achieve success in New York City, but pay the price. It was an attack on the record industry, which apparently caused Fagan and Kookoolis to be blacklisted.

Productions
The 1971 Broadway show opened on January 12 after 21 previews at the Ritz Theatre, and closed after three performances on January 13.

The show was musically directed by Louis St. Louis, set design Kert F. Lundell, costume design David Chapman, lighting design Jules Fisher, audio design Jack Shearing, vocal arrangements by Louis and Jacqueline Penn, orchestrations by Howard Wyeth and Jon Huston, additional staging by Gerald Freedman, and choreography by Fred Benjamin. The band included Louis on piano, Richard Apuzzo on guitar and electric guitar, Adam Ippolito on organ and tuba, John Trivers fender bass and guitar, and Tim Case on drums.

The original cast featured Peter Allen (Henry), Dennis Belline (Wilson Wilson), Barry Bostwick (Kelly), Pendleton Brown (Psychedelic Necktie), Angus Cairns (Record Company Executive), Joseph Campbell Butler (Neil), Nell Carter (Sharon), Paul Eichel (Record Company Executive), Leata Galloway (Faith), Richard Gere (Michael), Marta Heflin (Annie), Del Hinkley (Record Company Executive), Michael Jason (Henry's Friend), Tony Middleton (Songwriter), John C. Nelson (Henry's Friend), Pamela Pentony (Rita), Marion Ramsey (Hope), Vicki Sue Robinson (Charity), Larry Spinelli (Record Company Executive), and Singer Williams (Henry's Friend).

Reception
Martin Brookspan said "The tide of Rock musicals reaches its high water mark in Soon… an inventive, imaginative, brilliantly realized creation." Emory Lewis said "Soon is a hallelujah blessing, glorious music easily the best score of the season… I loved every rocking minute." John Schubeck said "Staggering shots of meaning. Dynamite in so many ways." In The New Yorker, Brendan Gill called the show “a disaster.”

Songs

Act I 
Let the World Begin Again 	 	
In Your Hands 	 	
I See the Light/ Gentle Sighs 	 	
Roll Out the Morning 	 	
Everybody's Running 	 	
Henry Is Where It's At 	 	
Music, Music 	 	
Glad to Know Ya 	 	
Rita Cheeta 	 	
Henry's Dream Theme 	 	
To Touch the Sky 	 	
Everybody's Running (Reprise)	 	
Marketing, Marketing 	 	
Sweet Henry Loves You 	 	
One More Time 	 	
Straight 	 	
Wait

Act II 
Faces, Names and Places 	 	
Annie's Thing 	 	
Doing the High 	 	
Soon 	 	
Country Store Living 	 	
What's Gonna Happen to Me 	 	
On the Charts 	 	
Molecules 	 	
So Much That I Know 	 	
Child of Sympathy 	 	
Frustration 	 	
Doing the High (Reprise)	 	
It Won't Be Long

References

External links
 
 Original Broadway poster

1971 musicals
Broadway musicals
Rock musicals
Rock operas
Sung-through musicals